Arthur Robert Bennett (16 November 1868 – 7 May 1899) was an English first-class cricketer active 1893–96 who played for Nottinghamshire. He was born in Nottingham; died in Marylebone. He was born in Mapperley, the son of Charles Bennett, a brickmaker.

References

1868 births
1899 deaths
English cricketers
Nottinghamshire cricketers